is a Japanese manufacturer of model railroad equipment in N and HO scales. Founded in 1957, the Tokyo-based company manufactures models based on Japanese prototypes (such as the Shinkansen bullet train) for the Japanese market, North American prototypes for the North American market and European high-speed trains for European market. The design and distribution of models for the North American market are handled by their U.S. subsidiary, Kato USA, founded in 1986 and located in Schaumburg, Illinois.

The Kato (pronounced kah-toe) model railroad companies were founded by Yuji Kato, father of current president Hiroshi Kato, of the parent company Sekisui Kinzoku Co., Ltd.

Yuji Kato, the founder of Sekisui Kinzoku Co., Ltd., died on November 21, 2016.

Unitrack

In both N scale and HO scale, Kato also manufactures an integrated roadbed model railroad track brand named Unitrack.  What distinguishes Unitrack from other brands of integrated roadbed track is Kato's Unijoiner. This unique track joiner is also used by Tillig in their TT scale integrated roadbed Bedding Track products.

Locomotive features

Kato N-scale locomotive features include: 
Powerful 5-pole motors
Blackened metal wheels
and on some models: 
Operating ditch lights
Directional golden white LEDs
All-wheel electrical pickup

KATO Digital

A multiple train control system named KATO Digital was introduced in the late 1980s for HO scale model trains. Conceptually it is similar to Digital Command Control (DCC). Although an important milestone for Kato, KATO Digital was not very successful; both the controller units and the decoder modules required for the locomotives were expensive, and locomotives equipped with a KATO Digital decoder could not be used on conventional systems, making it difficult to run one's locomotives on friends' layouts or club layouts.

See also
 Tomy, Kato's main competitor in Japan
 T-TRAK, a modular standard using Kato Unitrack

References

External links

 Kato Precision Railroad Models
 Kato USA

Manufacturing companies based in Tokyo
Model railroad manufacturers
Toy train manufacturers
Japanese brands
1957 establishments in Japan
Model manufacturers of Japan